The 4780th Air Defense Wing is a discontinued United States Air Force organization.  Its last assignment was with the Air Defense Weapons Center at Perrin Air Force Base, Texas, where it was discontinued in 1971.  The wing was organized in 1962 when Air Defense Command (ADC) assumed the interceptor pilot training mission from Air Training Command (ATC).

The 4780th assumed the personnel, equipment, and mission of ATC's 3555th Flying Training Wing, which was simultaneously discontinued.  During the Cuban Missile Crisis, the wing maintained aircraft on alert in Texas and Florida. The wing was discontinued in 1971 when ADC concentrated all its fighter crew training at Tyndall Air Force Base, Florida.  Between 1965 and 1969, the wing was twice awarded the Air Force Outstanding Unit Award for its mission performance,

History
In 1958, Strategic Air Command and Tactical Air Command took responsibility from Air Training Command (ATC) for the conduct of their combat crew training,    However, ATC's 3555th Flying Training Wing (Advanced Interceptor), which had trained all-weather interceptor pilots for all USAF commands, including Air Defense Command (ADC) since 1953, continued interceptor crew training. Most interceptor pilots trained at Perrin, however, were later assigned to ADC. In March 1962, ADC decided it wanted to merge Perrin Air Force Base's interceptor school with other air defense resources.  ADC acquired Perrin from ATC on 1 July 1962 and with it the 3555th Wing and its three Flying Training Squadrons. On that date, ADC discontinued the 3555th Wing and formed the 4780th Air Defense Wing (Training) with the 3555th's personnel and equipment. In addition to its operational squadrons, the wing was assigned a number of support and maintenance organizations to fulfill its role as USAF host organization for Perrin.

The 4780th trained qualified pilots to operate the Convair F-102 Delta Dagger and Convair F-106 Delta Dart interceptor aircraft as combat weapons. In addition, it conducted lead-in training with the F-102 for F-106 Delta Dart and Convair B-58 Hustler. From 1962 to 1971 Perrin had the largest fleet of F-102 Delta Daggers in the US Air Force. Perrin was the only F-102 training base within ADC.  The wing conducted a water survival skills school on nearby Lake Texoma, whose graduates included seventeen astronauts.

In October 1962 during the Cuban Missile Crisis the wing suspended its training mission and placed all its interceptor aircraft on five-minute alert, some flying missions to Florida.

The wing was awarded two Air Force Outstanding Unit Awards for its performance from 1965 through 1969. In addition, elements of the wing earned a third award for the period from January 1969 through May 1970, In 1969 the 4780th won the United States Air Force Flying Safety Plaque for flying 38,551 hours without a major accident. On 3 March 1971, it was announced that Perrin would close. On 13 May 1971 the last graduating class flew its F-102s in formation over Sherman and Denison, Texas as a farewell to its two host cities.  A few days later the last of the Delta Daggers left the base, and the 4780th Air Defense Wing was discontinued.

Lineage
 Designated as the 4780th Air Defense Wing (Training) and organized on 1 July 1962
 Discontinued on 30 June 1971

Assignments
 73d Air Division, 1 July 1962
 Fourteenth Air Force, 1 April 1966
 Tenth Air Force, 1 July 1968
 Air Defense Weapons Center, 15 November 1969 – 30 June 1971

Stations
 Perrin Air Force Base, Texas, 1 July 1962 – 30 June 1971

Components
 Group
 4780th Air Base Group, 1 July 1962 – 30 June 1971

 Operational Squadrons
 4780th Flying Training Squadron (later 4780th Air Defense Squadron), 1 July 1962 – 30 June 1971
 4781st Flying Training Squadron (later 4781st Combat Crew Training Squadron), 1 July 1962–31 Dec 1969
 4782nd Combat Crew Training Squadron, 1 July 1962 – 30 June 1971

 Maintenance Squadrons
 4780th Armament & Electronics Maintenance Squadron (later 4780th Communications & Electronics Maintenance Squadron, 4780th Avionics Maintenance Squadron), 1 January 1963 – 30 June 1971
 4780th Consolidated Aircraft Maintenance Squadron, 1 July 1962 – 1 January 1963
 4780th Field Maintenance Squadron, 1 January 1963 – 30 June 1971
 4780th Munitions Maintenance Squadron, 15 September 1966 – 30 June 1971
 4780th Organizational Maintenance Squadron, 1 January 1963 – 30 June 1971

 Other
 4780th USAF Hospital (later 4780th USAF Dispensary) 1 July 1962 – 8 October 1970
 USAF Dispensary, Perrin, 8 October 1970 – 30 June 1971
 4780th Physiological Training Flight, ca. 1 July 1962 – 1 Jan 1969

Aircraft
 F-102A, 1962–1971
 TF-102A, 1962–1971
 T-33A, 1962–1971
 T-37B 1965–1971
  HH-43B 1965–1971.

Commanders
 Col. Raymond K. Gallagher, 1 July 1962 – unknown
 Col. John R. Kullman, 7 August 1964 – unknown
 Col. R. H. Dettre, unknown – 30 June 1967
 Col. Walter R, Hardee, Jr., 30 June 1967 – 15 June 1969
 Col. Vermont Garrison, 16 June 1969 – 30 Jun 1971

Awards

See also
 List of MAJCOM wings of the United States Air Force

References

Notes

Bibliography

 
 AF Pamphlet 900-2, Unit Decorations, Awards and Campaign Participation Credits, Department of the Air Force, Washington, DC, 15 Jun 71
 AF Pamphlet 900-2, Unit Decorations, Awards and Campaign Participation Credits, Vol II  Department of the Air Force, Washington, DC, 30 Sep 76

Four Digit Wings of the United States Air Force
Air defense wings of the United States Air Force
Military units and formations established in 1962
Military units and formations disestablished in 1971
Military units and formations in Texas